Patikirige Sathischandra Edirisinghe (born 11 February 1941 as Patikirige Sathischandra Edirisinghe, සතිස්චන්ද්‍ර එදිරිසිංහ) [Sinhala] is an actor in Sri Lankan cinema, stage drama and television. Considered one of the earliest pillars of Sri Lankan drama history, Edirisinghe is noted as a highly versatile actor with a career spanning more than five decades. He is a recipient of life time awards at many award ceremonies.

Personal life
Sathischandra Edirisinghe was born on 11 February 1941 in Kelaniya as the sixth child of the family. His father is late Patikirige Edirisinghe was a Chief Supervisor of the Department of Cottage Industries. Mother is late Ushettige Elizabeth Perera was a housewife. He has one elder brother, late Dharmasiri, four elder sisters - Techla Sandaseelee, late Florida Katherine, Mershia Sirima and Mary Elizabeth and two younger brothers - Nimal Ranjith and Sunil. Youngest of the family, Sunil is a singer in Sri Lankan music industry.

Sathischandra Edirisinghe completed his education from five schools. He started preschool career with Sir D. B. Jayatilaka Vidyalaya, then entered to Sri Dharmaloka College, Kelaniya in 1947. After ten years in the school, Edirisinghe then moved to St. Mary's College, Elpitiya in 1958 to completed A/L from art stream. In 1960, he entered Stafford College and in 1964, he completed his secondary education from Vidyodaya Pirivena, Maligakanda.

In 1965, he married Kariyapperuma Arachchige Sriya Kariyapperuma. Sriya was born on November 7, 1941, to Baron Perera Kariyapperuma who worked as a clerk and Sumanawathie Cooray. She was the eldest of the ten siblings in her family. She had her education at Sri Dharmaloka College, Kelaniya, where she met Sathischandra Edirisinghe. She also had a keen interest on drama, where she acted in many school stage dramas, directed by Sathischandra. The couple has three children - Udaya, Shashini and Udara.

Elderst son, Udaya Shashipriya studied at S. Thomas' College, Gurutalawa. He currently handles his own business called "U and I Ceylon (Pvt) Ltd.". Second one is the daughter, Shashini who studied at St. Paul's Balika Maha Vidyalaya, Kelaniya. She is a B.Com graduate and currently resides in Australia. Youngest one is Udara Asanga, studied at Royal College, Colombo. He is interested in textile and fashion designing in Australia, All are married.

Theater work
Edirisinghe started to show his talents when he is at Sri Dharmaloka Central College. His first teacher was Ravilal Wimaladharma, who had keen interest on literature and music. At grade 5, he tried to act Madduma Bandara at home, which is a drama in his literature book. After Wimaladharma saw his capabilities, Edirisinghe was appointed as in-charge of the stage play Sudo Sudu in the school. In 1953, he joined Lamapitiya program in Radio Ceylon. For role in Anton Chekhov’s Proposal at Inter-school drama competition, Edirisinghe adjudged the Best Actor of the Southern Province.

In 1961, he started his stage drama career where his elder brother, Dharmasiri Edirisinghe introduced him to Kala Guru J. D. A. Perera. In 1999, after the service in CTB and Mahaweli Authority, he became a full time artist. His peak as a theater actor came through his role in John de Silva's stage play Wessanthara. With wider recognition, he was able to cooperate with country's leading script writers such as Gunasena Galappathi, Dayananda Gunawardane, Henry Jayasena, Sugathapala de Silva, R.R. Samarakoon, Sunanda Mahendra, Ranjit Dharmakeerthi, S. Karunaratne, Lucien Bulathsinghala and Dhamma Jagoda. His one of memorable theater acting came through Henry Jayasena's Manaranjana Vedavarjana in 1965.

Notable works
 Baka Thapas
 Vessanthara
 Sri Wicrama 
 Ibi Katta
 Manaranja Wedewarjana
 Liyathabara
 Maha Hene Hiriyaka
 Maha Gedere
 Cheri Uyana (Cherry Orchard)
 Onna Babo Ethiniya
 Habun Katai Bath Dekatai
 Elade
 Erabodu Mal Pottu Pipila
 Geheniyak
 Sauren Ae Lada
 Ane Massine
 Ruduraya Saha Gangawa
 Liya Thambara

Television acting
Edirisinghe is considered one of the pioneer actors in Sri Lankan teledrama history. His maiden television acting came through Lucien Bulathsinhala's Ekamawakage Daruwo in 1982. In that drama, he played the main role as a school principal. He played in many popular films of the early stage of Sri Lankan television such as, Mihikathage Daruwo, Tharadevi and Palingu Menike.

Notable works - as actor

 Ambu Daruwo
Aravinda saha Indu
 Avindu Adura
 Chandi Kumarihami 
 Eke Mawakege Daruwo
 Gauwen Gauwa
 Kadathira
 Kokila Ginna
 Mihikathege Daruwo
 Minigandela
 Nisala Vilthera
 Paligu Menike
 Sausiri Uyana
Senehelatha Menike
 Sivmansala
Sonduru SIthaththi
 Sudu Hamine
 Sudu Mahaththuru
 Sudu Paraviyo
 Sujatha
 Sura-asura
 Suseema 
 Thara Devi
 Uthuru Sulanga
 Uthuwankande Sura Saradiyel
 Wassanaye Hiru Evidin

Notable works - both as producer and actor
 Tikiri Nileme
 Namal Golla
 Bopath Sakkiya
 Girikula Andereya
 Suwanda Padma 
 Diyawadana Maluwa 
 Monaravila 
 Sathmahala

Career as a director
In 1963, he started his first direction and production of stage dramas with the play Baka Thapas. Out of 20 stage plays he acted, six of them were his production and direction. In 1964, he produced second stage play, Atthikka Mal Pipila with his own script. He produced another four stage dramas – Hotabari Yuddae based on George Orwell's Animal Farm, Thahanchi, Sokkano Rajano and Apaya Avurudu.

With his success at both stage drama and cinema, Edirisinghe turned to film making in 1973. His first cinematic direction came through Matara Aachchi in 1973. The film made a landmark in Sinhala film history as he introduced his little brother Sunil Edirisinghe as a singer, Wally Nanayakkara as lyricist and Victor Ratnayake as a film music director. All of them became big names in the proceeding years in Sri Lankan artistic history.

Not only in cinema, he has produced eleven television serials of which he directed seven. In 2019, he was honored with Janabhimani Honorary Award at the Bandaranaike Memorial International Conference Hall.

Beyond acting
In 1965, he was attached with Ceylon Transport of Bus (CTB) as a clerk. After the marriage and few years of work, he resigned from CTB and joined to Mahaweli Authority in 1986. In the authority, he served as the Manager in Cultural Affairs from 1986 to 1998.

In 2008, Edirisinghe was invited to take the position of Consultant in Cultural Affairs in the Ministry of Irrigation.

He is an author who published many books such as Apa Sathu Minimuthu, Kata Wata Kara Weta and Jalaya Saha Minisa. He has written nearly 25 books, where Eight books for children.

Edirisinghe went with a script writer to Kuwait in 1990 for a stage drama. During that period, Sadaam Hussein captured Iran and the crew were stuck there for 47 days in the Middle East. After 47 days, they came back to Sri Lanka. A felicitation ceremony titled Sathischandra Edirisinghe in Retrospect was held on 16 January 2011 at 6 pm at Kularatne hall in Ananda College Maradana organised by Telemakers Guild.

During a family trip to Ella, Badulla in January 2019, gold jewellery and cash worth nearly Rs.189,000 had been stolen from the family. Police said that the thief might have entered the room through a window as one of the windows was opened.

The children's teledrama based on Edirisinghe's children's book 'Raththaran Daruwek' (Golden Child) directed by Anura Waragoda will be telecast on Independent Television Network on the 3 October 2020 at 5.30 pm.

Author works
 Apa Sathu Minimuthu
 Kata Wata Kara Weta
 Jalaya Saha Minisa
 Adaraya Saha Vivahaya
 Ape Thaththa
 Guru Bhumika Nirupanaya
 Raththaran Daruwek
 Thanhawa Dukata Hethu We
 Wanduru Nuwana

Legacy
On January 14, 2008,  felicitation program titled Sathischandra Prathibhanaya was held at 3 pm at Sarasavi Studio, Dalugama, Kelaniya. The program was organized by Nuwana Youth Organisation.

For the enormous contribution rendered to the Sri Lankan drama career, he is honored with Kala Suri in 1990 by late President Ranasinghe Premadasa. and conferred with an honorary degree from the University of Kelaniya in 2006.

Awards

Presidential Awards

|-
|| 1985 ||| Hima Kathara || Best Supporting Actor ||

Sumathi Awards

|-
|| 2003 ||| Contribution to drama || U.W. Sumathipala Award ||

Raigam Tele'es

|-
|| 2010 ||| Contribution to drama || Prathibha Prabha Award ||

Filmography
Edirisinghe started his film career with Sadol Kandulu back in 1966, directed by Senator Reggie Perera. Through that, he performed many dramatic and supportive roles in more than 35+ films. In 1982, he was lucky to be participate for International Mannheim Film Festival held in Germany. During that film festival, he received a merit certificate for the film Adhishtanaya. Then he took that film again to the Ludwigshafen Film Congress
  
 No. denotes the Number of Sri Lankan film in the Sri Lankan cinema.

References

External links
 Sathischandra's Youtube channel
Sathischandra Edirisinghe pays a visit to the Vedda chief
Meeting Sathischandra Edirisinghe
‘caltex water & life’ enters north and east
මම රස්සාවකට ගියේ නෑ ගියේ සේවයට
'Sathmahala' : Story of rich and affluent
 සතිස්ගේ යකඩ කට

Sri Lankan male film actors
Sinhalese male actors
Living people
1941 births